Furcula scolopendrina, the zigzag furcula moth or poplar kitten moth, is a species of prominent moth in the family Notodontidae. It was described by Jean Baptiste Boisduval in 1869 and is found in North America.

The MONA or Hodges number for Furcula scolopendrina is 7940.

References

 Lafontaine, J. Donald & Schmidt, B. Christian (2010). "Annotated check list of the Noctuoidea (Insecta, Lepidoptera) of North America north of Mexico". ZooKeys. 40: 1-239.

Further reading

 Arnett, Ross H. (2000). American Insects: A Handbook of the Insects of America North of Mexico. CRC Press.

External links

insectidentification.org, Zig-Zag Furcula Moth

Notodontidae
Moths described in 1869